HMS Neptune was a 90-gun second rate ship of the line of the Royal Navy, built at Portsmouth Dockyard to the draught specified by the 1745 Establishment as amended in 1750, and launched on 17 July 1757.

Neptune was the flagship for Vice-Admiral Charles Knowles in 1757. One of Neptunes midshipmen at this time was John Hunter, later to become an admiral and the second Governor of New South Wales.

Neptune was converted to serve as a sheer hulk in 1784, and continued in this role until she was broken up in 1816.

Neptune has been identified as the subject of a 1764 prize-winning painting by Liverpool marine artist Richard Wright, subsequently engraved by William Woollett entitled The Fishery.

Notes

References

Lavery, Brian (2003) The Ship of the Line – Volume 1: The development of the battlefleet 1650–1850. Conway Maritime Press. .

Ships of the line of the Royal Navy
1757 ships